The following is a list of symbols of the U.S. state of Michigan. Bills to designate state symbols in Michigan are referred to the Government Operations Committee in either chamber.

State symbols

Other symbols
United States quarter dollar - Michigan 2004

See also
List of U.S. state, district, and territorial insignia
Outline of Michigan

Notes

References

External links
Michigan's State Symbols

</noinclude>

Michigan
State symbols